GNV may refer to:

 Gainesville Regional Airport (IATA airport code: GNV; ICAO airport code: KGNV), in Florida, USA
 Grand Airways (IATA airline code: QD; ICAO airline code: GNV; callsign: GRAND VEGAS), a defunct U.S. airline; see List of defunct airlines of the United States (A–M)
 Genivar (stock ticker GNV), a Canadian engineering consulting company
 Grandi Navi Veloci, an Italian shipping company
 GNU's Not VMS, an operating system, a reimplementation of OpenVMS
 1599 Geneva Bible (GNV)

See also